Nicholas Fotion (born 1929) is an American philosopher noted for his contributions to the philosophy of ethics and philosophy of language. He has written on military ethics, terrorism, and just war theory.  He has also worked on the speech act theory of John Searle and J.L. Austin. He is professor emeritus at Emory University.

References

1929 births
20th-century American philosophers
Philosophers of language
Living people